Donald Clinton Jackson (born September 2, 1956) is an American ice hockey coach and former professional ice hockey player who played 315 games in the National Hockey League between 1978 and 1987 and began his coaching career in 1988.

Since May 2014, he has been serving as head coach of EHC Red Bull München in Germany.

Playing career 
Jackson grew up playing ice hockey in Bloomington, Minnesota, for John F. Kennedy High School and earned a scholarship to attend and play for the Fighting Irish of Notre Dame.  Prior to graduating from the University of Notre Dame in 1978, Jackson was drafted by the Minnesota North Stars in the NHL's 1976 Amateur Draft, third round, 39th overall.  He played 2 games for the North Stars late in the 1978 season after finishing his college career and spent most of the next 3 seasons playing for the North Stars minor league team, the Oklahoma City Stars.  Prior to the 1981–82 NHL season, Jackson was traded to the Edmonton Oilers and played most of that season with Edmonton's minor league team, the Wichita Wind.  Jackson earned his NHL break at the beginning of the 1982–83 season and played 262 games for the Oilers, earning Stanley Cup Champion rings in 1984 and 1985.  After the 1985–86 season, Jackson was traded to the New York Rangers for his final NHL season before retiring.

Jackson was also a member of the United States Ice Hockey World Cup team at the 1978 and 1979 Ice Hockey World Championship tournaments.

Coaching career 
Jackson returned to ice hockey in 1989 as the head coach for the Knoxville Cherokees of the East Coast Hockey League (ECHL).  His success with the Cherokees during the 1990–91 earned him recognition as Coach of the Year.  In 1991, Jackson was hired by Pierre Page as an assistant coach for the Quebec Nordiques, where he served for 3 seasons.  He moved on to serve as head coach for the Cincinnati Cyclones of the IHL for the 1994–95 season, the Wichita Thunder of the Central Hockey League for the 1995–96 season and the Kansas City Blades of the IHL for the 1996–97 season.  In 1997, Jackson was hired by Kevin Constantine as assistant coach for the Pittsburgh Penguins, serving 3 seasons.  Jackson was employed as assistant coach by the Chicago Blackhawks for 3 months of the 2000–01 season, and was named assistant coach of the Ottawa Senators the following year.  Jackson stayed with the Senators until his contract ended without being renewed in 2004.

The 2004–05 NHL Lockout pushed Jackson to find a coaching role in Europe.  Late into the 2004–05 season of the Deutsche Eishockey Liga (German Hockey League), Jackson was asked by General Manager Peter Lee and Head Coach Pierre Page to join the Eisbären Berlin coaching staff as an assistant.  Berlin won their first championship that season.

Berlin's success helped Jackson earn his first head coaching position in the Deutsche Eishockey Liga (DEL) with Lance Nethery and DEG Metro Stars of Düsseldorf, who ended the 2004–05 season in 10th place.  In Jackson's first season, 2005–06, in Düsseldorf, he coached the team to a third-place regular season finish and into the playoff finals, where they lost against the Eisbären Berlin in 2006 DEL playoff finals.  Jackson carried that success into a second season in Düsseldorf, finishing second in regular season play and losing in the playoff semi-finals.

After the 2006–07 season Jackson moved on to fill the head coach position for the Eisbären Berlin of the Deutsche Eishockey Liga, who had finished in 9th place.  Jackson repeated the success he demonstrated in Düsseldorf by coaching Eisbären Berlin to a second-place regular season finish and a playoff finals DEL championship in his first season there.  For that achievement, Jackson was awarded the Order of Merit of Berlin.  In his six seasons as head coach with Eisbären Berlin (2007–13), Jackson coached the team to 3 first-place regular season finishes, 5 DEL championships, and a 2010 victory for the European Trophy (currently, Champions Hockey League).

In 2013, Jackson joined Red Bull Hockey to coach their team EC Red Bull Salzburg in the Austrian Hockey League for the 2013–14 season, which had finished their previous season in 8th place. Jackson again repeated his success by coaching the team to a first-place regular season finish, losing a game 7 overtime in the League Playoff finals.  After the season, Red Bull Hockey moved Jackson to their team, EHC Red Bull München, for the 2014–15 season where the team finished second overall but exited the playoffs early.  The second-place finish earned Red Bull München a position in the 2015–16 Champions Hockey League, where they won in the group stage to advance to the playoff, then lost in the round of 32. Jackson's leadership of EHC Red Bull München for the 2015–16 season again improved on the team's success by finishing in first place in regular season play, and culminating in a 4-game sweep of the Wolfsburg Grizzlys for the 2016 DEL Playoff Championship. This is the 6th DEL Playoff Championship for Jackson in his 10 years as a head coach in the Deutsche Eishockey Liga.

In both the 2016–17 and 2017-18 campaigns, Jackson led Munich to a successful defense of its title, capturing his seventh and eighth German championships as a head coach.

Head coach record

Awards and achievements
1983–84 - NHL - Stanley Cup (Edmonton)
1984–85 - NHL - Stanley Cup (Edmonton)
1991 ECHL Coach of the Year (John Brophy Award)
2007–08 - DEL (Deutsche Eishockey Liga) Champions (Eisbären Berlin)
2008 - Order of Merit of Berlin
2008–09 - DEL (Deutsche Eishockey Liga) Champions (Eisbären Berlin)
2010–11 - DEL (Deutsche Eishockey Liga) Champions (Eisbären Berlin)
2011–12 - DEL (Deutsche Eishockey Liga) Champions (Eisbären Berlin)
2012–13 - DEL (Deutsche Eishockey Liga) Champions (Eisbären Berlin)
2015–16 - DEL (Deutsche Eishockey Liga) Champions (EHC Red Bull München)
2016–17 - DEL (Deutsche Eishockey Liga) Champions (EHC Red Bull München)
2017–18 - DEL (Deutsche Eishockey Liga) Champions (EHC Red Bull München)

Career statistics

Regular season and playoffs

International

References

External links

1956 births
Living people
American men's ice hockey defensemen
Birmingham South Stars players
Calgary Cowboys draft picks
Chicago Blackhawks coaches
Edmonton Oilers players
Ice hockey people from Minneapolis
Ice hockey coaches from Minnesota
Minnesota North Stars draft picks
Minnesota North Stars players
New York Rangers players
Notre Dame Fighting Irish men's ice hockey players
Oklahoma City Stars players
Ottawa Senators coaches
Pittsburgh Penguins coaches
Quebec Nordiques coaches
Recipients of the Order of Merit of Berlin
Sportspeople from Bloomington, Minnesota
Wichita Thunder coaches
Wichita Wind players
Sports coaches from Minneapolis